Michael F. Rivers Sr. is an American politician. He is a member of the South Carolina House of Representatives from the 121st District, serving since 2016. He is a member of the Democratic party. Rivers served on the Beaufort County School Board from 1998 to 2016.

Rivers serves as Chaplain of the South Carolina Legislative Black Caucus.

References

Living people
1958 births
Democratic Party members of the South Carolina House of Representatives
21st-century American politicians
African-American people in South Carolina politics
Claflin University alumni
21st-century African-American politicians
20th-century African-American people